DGM may refer to:

DGM (band), an Italian metal band
Discipline Global Mobile, an independent record label founded in 1992 by Robert Fripp and David Singleton
DGM Racing, formerly known as King Autosport, a Canadian stock car racing team